Frederic(k) or Fred Bennett may refer to:

Fred Bennett (born 1983), American football player
Fred Bennett (baseball) (1902–1957), MLB outfielder
Fred Bennett (footballer) (1906–1990), English footballer
Frederic Bennett (1918–2002), English journalist, barrister and Conservative Party Member of Parliament
Frederick Bennett (bishop) (1872–1950), New Zealand Anglican bishop
Frederick Debell Bennett (1806–1859), English ship surgeon and biologist
Frederick Bennett (actor) on List of All Creatures Great and Small (TV series) characters

See also